Wyoming Highway 161 (WYO 161) is a  Wyoming State Road located in eastern Goshen County and travels from an intersection with U.S. Route 85 (US 85) and WYO 152 near Yoder east to WYO 92 at Huntley.

Route description
Wyoming Highway 161 is a  highway that begins its west end at US 85 and the eastern terminus of WYO 152 just east of the town of Yoder (WYO 152 continues west). WYO 161 heads east, turns north briefly at approximately 3 miles, but quickly turns back east. For its entire length, WYO 161 travels through farmland and only intersects county and local roads. Highway 161 reaches its end at WYO 92 in the community of Huntley.

Major intersections

References

External links 

Wyoming State Routes 100-199
WYO 161 - WYO 92 to US 85/WYO 152

Transportation in Goshen County, Wyoming
161